Rev. Asahel Norton Homestead is a historic home and farm complex located at Kirkland in Oneida County, New York.

The owner, Rev. Asahel Norton (Sept. 20, 1765-May 10, 1853) was a graduate of Yale College. He became known in later life for his interest in pomology, and for his apple trees. He was one of the founders of Hamilton College.

The home was built about 1797 and is a two-story wood-frame structure with a five bay, center hall configuration in a vernacular Federal style. Also on the property are the original well, chicken coop and animal barn, and fruit orchard.

The homestead was listed on the National Register of Historic Places in 1999.

References

Houses on the National Register of Historic Places in New York (state)
Federal architecture in New York (state)
Houses completed in 1797
Houses in Oneida County, New York
National Register of Historic Places in Oneida County, New York
Clinton (village), New York